Ismail Sulaiman Ashoor Al-Ajmi (born 9 June 1984), commonly known as Ismail Al-Ajmi, is an Omani footballer who plays for Al-Nahda Club in Oman Professional League.

Club career

Muscat
In the 2005–06 Omani League, Ismail was given the 'Top Scorer' award for a total of 12 goals and hence helping his club to win the overall Championship.

Kuwait
Ismail's most valuable goal for Kuwait SC came in the Final of the 2009 AFC Cup. The goal was scored seconds before the referee's whistle. This goal meant that is the Champion of the AFC Cup of 2009.

Saham
On 25 September 2014, he signed a one-year contract with 2014 GCC Champions League runners-up Saham SC.

Al-Nahda
On 28 January 2015, he signed a six-month contract with 2014–15 Oman Professional League champions, Al-Nahda Club.

Club career statistics

International career

Gulf Cup of Nations
Ismail has made appearances in the 2007 Gulf Cup of Nations, the 2009 Gulf Cup of Nations, the 2010 Gulf Cup of Nations and the 2013 Gulf Cup of Nations.

AFC Asian Cup
Ismail has made appearances in the 2007 AFC Asian Cup qualification, the 2007 AFC Asian Cup, the 2011 AFC Asian Cup qualification and the 2015 AFC Asian Cup qualification.

In the 2007 AFC Asian Cup qualification, he scored four goals, a goal in a 3-0 win over Jordan, a goal in a 4-1 win over Pakistan, a goal in the return leg in a 5-0 win over Pakistan and another in a 2-1 win over the United Arab Emirates hence helping his team to qualify for the 2007 AFC Asian Cup. Badar Al-Maimani scored one and the only goal of Oman in the 2007 AFC Asian Cup in a 1-1 draw against Australia. In the tournament, Oman won two points in a 1-1 draw against Australia and in a 0-0 draw against Iraq and hence failed to qualify for the quarter-finals.

In the 2011 AFC Asian Cup qualification, he played in six matches and scored one goal in a 2-1 win over Indonesia. But Oman failed to qualify for the 2011 AFC Asian Cup.

He made four appearances in the 2015 AFC Asian Cup qualification but failed to score a single goal. He again helped his team to qualify for the 2015 AFC Asian Cup by finishing at the top of the Group A.

FIFA World Cup Qualification
Ismail has made seven appearances in the 2010 FIFA World Cup qualification and fifteen in the 2014 FIFA World Cup.

He scored two goals in the 2010 FIFA World Cup qualification, one in a 1-0 win over Thailand and another in a 1-1 draw against Bahrain.

He scored two goals in the 2014 FIFA World Cup qualification, one in the Second Round of FIFA World Cup qualification in a 2-0 win over Myanmar and another in the Fourth Round of FIFA World Cup qualification in a 1-0 win over Iraq. Oman entered the last game of group play with a chance to qualify for at least the playoff-round, but a 1-0 loss to Jordan eliminated them from contention.

National team career statistics

Goals for Senior National Team
Scores and results list Oman's goal tally first.

Honours

Club
With Kuwait SC
AFC Cup (1): 2009
Kuwait Federation Cup (1): 2009-10

With Kazma
Kuwait Federation Cup (0): Runner-up 2011-12
Kuwait Emir Cup (0): Runner-up 2012
Kuwait Super Cup (0): Runner-up 2011

Individual
2005–06 Omani League: Top Scorer

References

External links
 
 
 Ismail Al Ajmi at Goal.com
 
 

1984 births
Living people
People from Al Batinah North Governorate
People from Muscat, Oman
Omani footballers
Oman international footballers
Omani expatriate footballers
Association football forwards
2007 AFC Asian Cup players
Al-Khabourah SC players
Muscat Club players
Al-Shamal SC players
Umm Salal SC players
Kuwait SC players
Kazma SC players
Al-Faisaly FC players
Al-Nasr SC (Kuwait) players
Saham SC players
Al-Nahda Club (Oman) players
Qatar Stars League players
Saudi Professional League players
Oman Professional League players
Expatriate footballers in Qatar
Omani expatriate sportspeople in Qatar
Expatriate footballers in Kuwait
Omani expatriate sportspeople in Kuwait
Expatriate footballers in Saudi Arabia
Omani expatriate sportspeople in Saudi Arabia
Footballers at the 2002 Asian Games
Footballers at the 2006 Asian Games
Asian Games competitors for Oman
AFC Cup winning players
Kuwait Premier League players